Plymouth, Nova Scotia  may refer to:

 Plymouth, Pictou County, Nova Scotia
 Plymouth, Yarmouth County, Nova Scotia